Havella is the largest islet in Menkeøyane, part of Thousand Islands, a Norwegian archipelago south of Edgeøya. It is named after the long-tailed duck (Clangula hyemalis), a migrant to Svalbard.

References 

 Norwegian Polar Institute Place Names of Svalbard Database

Islands of Svalbard